This is a list of Singaporean international footballers who were born outside Singapore. Players born in countries other than Singapore including those born in diaspora may qualify for the Singapore team through Singaporean parents or grandparents, or through residency in Singapore and subsequent naturalisation as Singaporean citizens.

List of players naturalized and had played for National Team 

The following players were naturalized and have go on to play for the National Team.

List of players who choose to play for National Team 

The following players have choose to represent Singapore National Team even though they can represent other countries (i.e. parent's original country, country of birth etc..)

References 

Football in Singapore
Footballers in Singapore
Singapore
Association football player non-biographical articles